Ladislaus or László Szalkai (1475-1526) was a Hungarian bishop, treasurer and chancellor.

Life
The son of a shoemaker from Mátészalka, he worked in the royal court from 1494, initially as a treasurer then as one of the royal secretaries. He was bishop of Vac (1513-1522), bishop of Eger (1524-1526), the archbishop of Esztergom (1524-1526) and primate of Hungary (from 1525). In the meantime he acted as royal treasurer (1516-1526) and chancellor (1518-1526). He was killed at the battle of Mohács.

References

1475 births
1526 deaths
People from Mátészalka
16th-century Roman Catholic bishops in Hungary